

American Scientist (informally abbreviated AmSci) is an American bimonthly science and technology magazine published since 1913 by Sigma Xi, The Scientific Research Society. In the beginning of 2000s the headquarters was in New Haven, CT. Each issue includes feature articles written by prominent scientists and engineers who review research in fields from molecular biology to computer engineering.

Each issue also includes the work of cartoonists, including those of Sidney Harris, Benita Epstein, and Mark Heath. Also included is the Scientists' Nightstand that reviews a vast range of science-related books and novels.

American Scientist Online was launched in May 2003.

References

External links
 

1913 establishments in the United States
Bimonthly magazines published in the United States
Magazines established in 1913
Magazines published in Connecticut
Magazines published in North Carolina
Science and technology magazines published in the United States
Mass media in New Haven, Connecticut